100 Classic Book Collection, known in North America as 100 Classic Books, is an e-book collection developed by Genius Sonority and published by Nintendo, which was released for the Nintendo DS handheld video game console. First released in Europe in December 2008, it was later released in Australia in January 2009, and in North America in June 2010. The game includes one hundred public domain works of literature.

Genius Sonority had previously released a similar collection of books in Japan, under the title DS Bungaku Zenshuu, in October 2007. A smaller version of the collection consisting of 20 books, under the title Chotto DS Bungaku Zenshu: Sekai no Bungaku 20, was released in Japan as a downloadable DSiWare application in February 2009. French and German versions, under the titles of 100 Livres Classiques and Bibliothek der klassischen Bücher respectively were released in March 2010.

Features 
100 Classic Book Collection features one hundred books stored into the DS cartridge. Several of the works included are Othello by William Shakespeare, Oliver Twist by Charles Dickens, and The Phantom of the Opera by Gaston Leroux. Additional free books were available to download via Nintendo Wi-Fi Connection until the discontinuation of the service on May 20, 2014.

The player is required to hold the DS like a book and is able to adjust the text size and change background music to listen to while reading. A bookmark feature allows the player to mark their place in the book, as well as resume from that point on restart of the game. The game offers a search feature for books in a number of different ways, including genre, author, and length. Players can access introductions for the books and read about the authors. An in-game quiz features asks players personality-related questions and recommends certain novels depending on the answers given. Players can send "trial versions" of the game to other DS users via the local Wi-Fi.

Reception 
100 Classic Book Collection debuted on UK sales charts at number 17 during its week of release, and moved up to number 8 the following week.

The content was well received, but critics felt the DS was not a suitable platform. Prior to the advent of Kindle, The Guardian newspaper reviewed the game as part of the "minority fad" of e-readers, declaring it bland and impersonal but good value for money. Eurogamer magazine criticised Nintendo for only using texts that were out of copyright and for not spending the extra for modern classics. They also found the text difficult to read due to the size of the screen, with unhelpful hyphenations, a low word number per page and distracting animations. The Telegraph newspaper agreed that the game offered good value for money but also criticised the size of the screen.

Included books

List of books included

Europe/Australia

North America

List of additional downloadable books

Europe/Australia

North America

France

References

External links 

2008 video games
Educational video games
Nintendo DS-only games
Nintendo DS games
Nintendo games
Touch! Generations
Video games based on novels
Video games developed in Japan